The Franklin Mountain woodland snail (Ashmunella pasonis) is a species of land snail in the family Polygyridae. It is native to New Mexico and Texas in the United States.

Distribution and habitat

The snail has a limited range in two isolated mountain ranges, but it is a common species within this range. The snail lives in open rocky mountain habitat and is only found in accumulations of limestone talus.

Reproduction

This species appears to have the capability of hybridizing with two other species: Ahmunella kochii sanandresensis and A. harrisi.

References

Polygyridae
Endemic fauna of New Mexico
Endemic fauna of Texas
Gastropods described in 1851
Taxonomy articles created by Polbot